7675 Gorizia, provisional designation , is a background asteroid from the inner regions of the asteroid belt, approximately 3 kilometers in diameter. It was discovered on 23 November 1995, by the staff at Farra d'Isonzo Observatory in northeastern Italy. It is named for the Italian town of Gorizia.

Orbit and classification 

Gorizia orbits the Sun in the inner main-belt at a distance of 2.2–2.6 AU once every 3 years and 9 months (1,371 days). Its orbit has an eccentricity of 0.09 and an inclination of 5° with respect to the ecliptic.

Physical characteristics 

As of 2017, Gorizias effective size and composition, as well as its rotation period and shape remain unknown. No estimates about Gorizias diameter and albedo have been published by any of the space-based surveys such as the Infrared Astronomical Satellite IRAS, the Japanese Akari satellite, or NASA's Wide-field Infrared Survey Explorer with its subsequent NEOWISE mission. It has an absolute magnitude of 14.4.

Based on a generic magnitude-to-diameter conversion, Gorizia measures between 3 and 7 kilometers for an albedo in the range of 0.05 to 0.25. Since asteroids in the inner main-belt are often of a silicaceous rather than of a carbonaceous composition, with higher albedos, typically around 0.20, Gorizias diameter might be on the lower end of NASA's published conversion table, as the higher the body's reflectivity (albedo), the smaller its diameter, for a given absolute magnitude (brightness).

Naming 

This minor planet was named for the northeastern Italian town of Gorizia, on the occasion of the 1000th anniversary celebrating its first documented mentioning. The discovering observatory, after which the asteroid 7501 Farra was named, is located not far from Gorizia. The official naming citation was published by the Minor Planet Center on 2 February 1999.

References

External links 
 Asteroid Lightcurve Database (LCDB), query form (info )
 Dictionary of Minor Planet Names, Google books
 Asteroids and comets rotation curves, CdR – Observatoire de Genève, Raoul Behrend
 Discovery Circumstances: Numbered Minor Planets (5001)-(10000) – Minor Planet Center
 
 

007675
007675
Named minor planets
19951123